Callyspongia serpentina is a species of demosponges in the family Callyspongiidae. It is found in Australia and New Zealand.

References

External links

Callyspongiidae
Animals described in 1814
Sponges of Australia
Sponges of New Zealand